Omar Elgeziry (born 20 January 1985) is an Egyptian modern pentathlete. He also had brothers who are pentathletes, namely Emad and Amro. He and Amro participated at the 2016 Summer Olympics in Rio de Janeiro, in the men's event.

He is currently the head fencing coach at the United States Air Force Academy.

References

1985 births
Living people
Egyptian male modern pentathletes
Olympic modern pentathletes of Egypt
Modern pentathletes at the 2016 Summer Olympics